St Aidan's is a Country Park between Leeds and Castleford in West Yorkshire, England.

St Aidan's or St. Aidan's may also refer to:

Churches and cathedrals
 St. Aidan's Cathedral, Enniscorthy, County Wexford, Ireland
 St. Aidan's Church (disambiguation)

Schools
 St Aidan's Academy (disambiguation)
 St Aidan's College (disambiguation)
 St. Aidan's School (disambiguation)

See also
 Aidan (disambiguation)